The Höllentalferner is a glacier in the western Wetterstein Mountains. It is a cirque glacier that covers the upper part of the Höllental valley and its location in a rocky bowl between the Riffelwandspitzen and Germany's highest mountain, the Zugspitze, means that it is well-protected from direct sunshine.

Geography 

It is the only German glacier with a proper glacial tongue. In spite of its relatively low elevation of just 2,570 m to 2,200 m, the glacier is not in acute danger because it is located in a deeply hollowed bowl and is fed by avalanche snow (as a Lawinenkesselgletscher or "avalanche bowl glacier") and is therefore less badly affected by global warming.

In order to climb the Zugspitze through the Höllental valley the Höllentalferner has to be negotiated. Depending on the season the randkluft of the glacier is a key point on the way to the Klettersteig.

References

External links 

 Archive of Bavarian Glaciers

Glaciers of Bavaria
Glaciers of the Alps
GHollentalferner 
Wetterstein